is a railway station in the city of Kanuma, Tochigi, Japan, operated by the private railway operator Tobu Railway. The station is numbered "TN-20".

Lines

Station layout
The station has one island platform connected to the station building by a footbridge.

Platforms

Adjacent stations

History
Itaga Station opened on 7 July 1929. The platforms were lengthened in 2006.

From 17 March 2012, station numbering was introduced on all Tobu lines, with Itaga Station becoming "TN-20".

Passenger statistics
In fiscal 2019, the station was used by an average of 87 passengers daily (boarding passengers only).

Surrounding area
Itaga Station is located in a rural area south of the center of former Itaga Village
Kanuma City Itaga Cultural Center

See also
 List of railway stations in Japan

References

External links

 Itaga Station information  

Railway stations in Tochigi Prefecture
Stations of Tobu Railway
Railway stations in Japan opened in 1929
Tobu Nikko Line
Kanuma, Tochigi